Mount Campbell may refer to:

 Mount Campbell (Alaska), a mountain in the Valdez-Cordova (CA) region in Alaska
 Mount Campbell (Antarctica), a mountain in the Prince Olav Mountains of Antarctica
 Mount Campbell (California), a small mountain in Sierra Nevada foothills near Reedley, California, United States
 Mount Campbell (Canada), a mountain near Penticton, British Columbia, Canada
 Mount Campbell (Cariboo), a mountain near Barkerville, British Columbia, Canada 
 Mount Campbell (Nunavut), a mountain in Nunavut, Canada
 Mount Campbell (New South Wales), a mountain in Tweed Shire, New South Wales, Australia
 Mount Campbell (Newfoundland and Labrador), a mountain in Newfoundland and Labrador, Canada
 Pukeone / Mount Campbell, a mountain in the Tasman region of New Zealand

See also
 Campbell Mountain
 Campbell Peak
 Campbell Hill (disambiguation)
 Campbell Hills
 Campbell Hills (Antarctica)